was a Japanese actor from Kurashiki Okayama Prefecture. He was an actor who specialized in playing comical roles. He became popular for his role as Sakura Kyōjyurō in the Three Outlaw Samurai series.

Selected filmography

Films
 Taiyō Umi o Someru toki (1961) as Rice
 Mekishiko Mushuku (1962) as Ankō
 Samurai from Nowhere (1964) as Misawa Ihei
 Three Outlaw Samurai (1964) as Sakura Kyōjyurō
 Akumyō Ichidai (1967)
 Lady Sazen and the Drenched Swallow Sword (1969) as Gamou Taiken
 Bloodstained Clan Honor (1970) as Taishō
 Tora-san Goes Religious? (1983) as Osakaya
 Hei no Naka no Purei Boru (1987)
 Shōrishatachi (1992)
 Ambition Without Honor (1996) 
 Blooming Again (2004) as Sakiyama Rokubei
 Mrs. (2005) as Yamamoto Tatsuo

Television drama
 Three Outlaw Samurai (1963-69)
 Hana no Shōgai (1963) as Kanroku
 Haru no Sakamichi (1971) as Yoya
 The Water Margin (1973) as Lu Zhishen
 Kaze to Kumo to Niji to (1976) as Taira no Yoshikane
 Seishi Yokomizo Series (1978) as Detective Hiyori
 Akō Rōshi (1979) as Kumo no Jinjyurō
 Kage no Gundan II (1981-82) as Gohei
 MUSASHI (2003) as Hōzōin In'ei

References

External links
 
Isamu Nagato at NHK

Japanese male film actors
20th-century Japanese male actors
1932 births
2013 deaths
People from Kurashiki
Male actors from Okayama